Calabash (locally known as Calabash Boom) is a neighborhood on the island of St. John in the United States Virgin Islands. It is located in the east of the island on the coast of Coral Bay, to the south of the town of Coral Bay.

References
Kidder, L.M. (ed.) (1999) Fodor's Caribbean 2000. New York: Fodor's Travel Publications.

Populated places in Saint John, U.S. Virgin Islands